The Venner Crime is a 1933 detective novel by John Rhode, the pen name of the British writer Cecil Street. It is the sixteenth in his long-running series of novels featuring Lancelot Priestley, a Golden Age armchair detective. In Britain it was published by Odhams Press, the only one of his works be done so, while in the United States it was handled by his usual publisher Dodd Mead. It has been described as a sort of sequel to his previous book The Claverton Mystery. Writing in the New York Times Isaac Anderson considered "This is not one of the best of the Dr. Priestley yarns, but it is plenty good enough to pass an idle evening."

Synopsis
An elderly man named Venner is poisoned by strychnine, but the case is at first mistaken as an accidental death. At almost exactly the same time his nephew Ernest disappears.

References

Bibliography
 Evans, Curtis. Masters of the "Humdrum" Mystery: Cecil John Charles Street, Freeman Wills Crofts, Alfred Walter Stewart and the British Detective Novel, 1920-1961. McFarland, 2014.
 Herbert, Rosemary. Whodunit?: A Who's Who in Crime & Mystery Writing. Oxford University Press, 2003.
 Reilly, John M. Twentieth Century Crime & Mystery Writers. Springer, 2015.

1933 British novels
Novels by Cecil Street
British crime novels
British mystery novels
British detective novels
Odhams Press books
Novels set in England